is a Japanese light novel written by Makoto Shinkai. It is a novelization of the animated film of the same name, which was directed by Shinkai. It was published in Japan by Kadokawa on June 18, 2016, a month prior to the film premiere.

Plot
Mitsuha Miyamizu, a high school girl living in the fictional town of Itomori in Gifu Prefecture's mountainous Hida region is fed up with her life in the countryside and wishes to be a handsome Tokyo boy in her next life. Later, Taki Tachibana, a high school boy living in Tokyo, wakes up and realizes that he is Mitsuha, who herself has somehow ended up in Taki's body.

Taki and Mitsuha realize they have switched bodies. They start communicating with each other by leaving notes on paper or leaving memos in each other's phones. As time passes, they become used to the body swap and start intervening in each other's lives. Mitsuha helps Taki develop a relationship with his female coworker, Miki Okudera, and eventually to go on a date with her, while Taki helps Mitsuha in becoming more popular in her school. Mitsuha tells Taki about a comet that is expected to pass close to Earth in a few days time, and how she is excited to see it, as it will arrive on the same day as her town's festival.

One day, Taki suddenly wakes up back in his body. After an unsuccessful first date with Okudera, he tries contacting Mitsuha but fails. He later finds that they have stopped switching bodies and eventually decides to visit Mitsuha in her hometown. Without knowing the name of her village, he travels around the Hida region, relying solely on the sketches of the village's scenery he has drawn from memory. Finally, a restaurant server recognizes the town in Taki's sketch as Itomori. He is then told that a fragment of the comet Tiamat fell to earth three years ago and obliterated Itomori and its surroundings, killing a third of the town's population. As Taki looks through the records of fatalities from the incident, he finds Mitsuha's name.

Attempting to reconnect with Mitsuha, Taki goes to Mitsuha's family shrine. Realizing that his and Mitsuha's timelines were actually separated by a few years the whole time, Taki drinks kuchikamizake that Mitsuha made and left behind as an offering, hoping to reconnect to her body before the comet strikes. Succeeding, he wakes up in her body on the morning of the festival, and realizes that he still has time to save the town. Convincing her friends about the comet, he gets their help in trying to evacuate the village. While they continue with their plans, Taki realizes that Mitsuha might be in his body at the shrine and heads back to the mountain to meet with her.

Mitsuha wakes up in Taki's body at the shrine and wanders to the summit of the mountain. Taki arrives at the summit as well; although they feel each other's presence, they are unable to see each other, due to the separation in their timelines. As the sun sets, and both Taki and Mitsuha realize it is twilight, they are transported back into their own bodies and are finally able to see each other. Taki tells Mitsuha to convince her estranged father, the mayor of Itomori, to evacuate the town. They decide to write each other's names on their hands as they return to their respective timelines, but Mitsuha suddenly disappears before she can start writing her name. As time begins to pass, their memories of each other start to fade and disappear; both of them forget each other's names, as well as the events that happened between them. On the verge of giving up, Mitsuha realizes that Taki wrote "I love you" on her hand instead of his name. Mitsuha confronts her father again with a new spirit of determination, and soon after, the broken fragment of Comet Tiamat crashes to Earth, destroying Itomori.

Eight years later, it is revealed that Mitsuha persuaded her father to conduct an emergency evacuation drill across the surrounding districts, allowing most of Itomori's residents to escape in time and survive. Taki has graduated from university and is trying to find a job, but still has lingering feelings that he is missing something important to him. He finds himself attracted to items relating to Itomori, such as magazines and people he thinks are familiar (whom he actually knew when he was in Mitsuha's body). While riding separate trains, Taki and Mitsuha are stunned to see each other when their trains suddenly run parallel to one another. They get out at their next stops and try to find each other; they finally meet at a staircase and, feeling as though they know each other somehow, ask for each other's name.

Release
By September 2016, the light novel had sold around 1,029,000 copies. In the second week in September 2016, the novel had sold around 112,000 more copies. After the wide release of the film adaptation in August 2016, the novel reached the top place in Oricon's weekly bunkobon sales charts for three consecutive weeks. The novel has sold over 1.3million copies as of December 2016. In August 2018, the novel was released in an audiobook format, with Romi Park reading.

Shortly afterwards, a follow up light novel was released on August 1, 2016, under the title Your Name. Another Side:Earthbound. The novel is set during the events of Your Name through the perspective of Mitsuha's friends and family. The light novel was written by Makoto Shinkai and Arata Kanoh, with illustrations by Masayoshi Tanaka and Hiyori Asakawa. In 2017, both light novels were published in English by Yen Press.

Manga adaptation
A manga version of the novel has also been written by Makoto Shinkai and illustrated by Ranmaru Kotone. The manga was licensed by Yen Press for an English release, with the first volume released on June 20, 2017.

Another Side:Earthbound also received a manga adaption, written by Arata Kanou and illustrated by Junya Nakamura, through the Cycomics app in July 2017. It was licensed by Yen Press, with the first volume releasing on December 11, 2018.

See also
 Your Name, the movie the book was based on
 Your Name (album), soundtrack album for the film by Radwimps

References

2016 Japanese novels
Fiction about body swapping
Novels based on films
Light novels
Kadokawa Corporation
Seinen manga
Yen Press titles